Caesium hydride or cesium hydride (CsH) is a compound of caesium and hydrogen. It is an alkali metal hydride.
It was the first substance to be created by light-induced particle formation in metal vapor, and showed promise in early studies of an ion propulsion system using caesium. It is the most reactive stable alkaline metal hydride of all. It is a powerful superbase and reacts with water extremely vigorously.

The caesium nuclei in CsH can be hyperpolarized through interactions with an optically pumped caesium vapor in a process known as spin-exchange optical pumping (SEOP). SEOP can increase the nuclear magnetic resonance (NMR) signal of caesium nuclei by an order of magnitude.

It is very difficult to make caesium hydride in a pure form. Caesium hydride can be produced by heating caesium carbonate and metallic magnesium in hydrogen at 580 to  620 degrees Celsius.

Crystal structure
At room temperature and atmospheric pressure, CsH has the same structure as NaCl.

References

Caesium compounds
Metal hydrides
Superbases
Rock salt crystal structure